Saharkhiz Mahalleh (also Romanized as Saḩarkhīz Maḩalleh; also known as Saḩarkhīz) is a village in Shirju Posht Rural District, Rudboneh District, Lahijan County, Gilan Province, Iran. At the 2006 census, its population was 474, in 127 families.

References 

Populated places in Lahijan County